Calais-Ville station (French: Gare de Calais-Ville) is a railway station in the city centre of Calais, France.

History
Gare de Ville opened in 1849, replacing the temporary St. Pierre station which had opened in 1846 and subsequently became the site of a marshalling yard. It was rebuilt in 1888–89.  In 1900, the metre gauge Chemin de fer d'Anvin à Calais (CF AC) was extended from St. Pierre to Calais-Ville, enabling the closure of St. Pierre.

In the Second World War, Calais-Ville station had been severely damaged in 1940 during the Battle of France, and further damaged in 1944 when Calais was liberated by Allied forces. The remaining station buildings were demolished and temporary buildings erected to serve until the station was rebuilt. The CF AC closed on 1 March 1955. Calais-Ville station was subsequently rebuilt.

Services
It is the principal station for commuter and short-distance rail services in Calais. Another station Calais-Fréthun, which is where longer distance trains depart from, is connected by a free shuttle bus service (to meet with trains to Paris). There is a third smaller station at Les Fontinettes.

There is a shuttle service bus from the Port of Calais to the station.

The station is served by the following trains:

High speed trains (TGV) Paris - Lille - Calais

Regional trains (TER Hauts-de-France):
line K16 to Boulogne, Amiens and Paris
line K21 to Boulogne and Amiens
line K71 to Hazebrouck and Lille

Local trains: (TER Hauts-de-France):
line P54 to Hazebrouck, Béthune, Lens and Arras
line P71 to Hazebrouck
line P72 to Dunkirk
line P73 to Boulogne, Étaples and Rang-du-Fliers

There is one TGV return service via Calais-Fréthun to Lille-Europe each day.

It was formerly served by the Chemin de fer d'Anvin à Calais between 1900 and 1955.

See also
Port of Calais
Port of Dover

References

Sources

Railway stations in Pas-de-Calais
Buildings and structures in Calais
Railway stations in France opened in 1849